The 2018 Skate America was the first event of six in the 2018–19 ISU Grand Prix of Figure Skating, a senior-level international invitational competition series. It was held at Angel of the Winds Arena in Everett, Washington on October 19–21. Medals were awarded in the disciplines of men's singles, ladies' singles, pair skating, and ice dancing. Skaters earned points toward qualifying for the 2018–19 Grand Prix Final.

Entries
The ISU published the preliminary assignments on June 29, 2018.

Changes to preliminary assignments

Results

Men

Ladies

Pairs

Ice dancing

References

External links
 2018 Skate America at the International Skating Union

Skate America
Skate America
Skate America